This article is about the particular significance of the year 1739 to Wales and its people.

Incumbents
Lord Lieutenant of North Wales (Lord Lieutenant of Anglesey, Caernarvonshire, Flintshire, Merionethshire, Montgomeryshire) – George Cholmondeley, 3rd Earl of Cholmondeley 
Lord Lieutenant of Glamorgan – Charles Powlett, 3rd Duke of Bolton
Lord Lieutenant of Brecknockshire and Lord Lieutenant of Monmouthshire – Thomas Morgan
Lord Lieutenant of Cardiganshire – John Vaughan, 2nd Viscount Lisburne
Lord Lieutenant of Carmarthenshire – vacant until 1755
Lord Lieutenant of Denbighshire – Sir Robert Salusbury Cotton, 3rd Baronet 
Lord Lieutenant of Pembrokeshire – Sir Arthur Owen, 3rd Baronet
Lord Lieutenant of Radnorshire – James Brydges, 1st Duke of Chandos

Bishop of Bangor – Thomas Herring 
Bishop of Llandaff – Matthias Mawson (from 18 February)
Bishop of St Asaph – Isaac Maddox
Bishop of St Davids – Nicholas Clagett

Events
March - Diarist William Bulkeley of Brynddu is a bearer at the funeral of Richard Bulkeley, 5th Viscount Bulkeley, and leaves an account in his diary.
20 May - The roof of St Mary's Church, Swansea, collapses into the nave just before a Sunday morning service; the congregation is waiting outside for the officiating priest, who is running late.
date unknown
Samuel and Nathaniel Buck tour Wales to produce the first of their prints of the country, following on from their prints of England.
A new parish church is completed at Willington Worthenbury near Wrexham, designed by Richard Trubshaw.

Arts and literature

New books
Rowland Ellis - A Salutation to the Britains (2nd London edition)
John Reynolds - The Scripture Genealogy and Display of Herauldry

Music

Births
January - Thomas Edwards (Twm o'r Nant), dramatist and poet (died 1810)
14 March - Prince Edward, Duke of York and Albany, second son and third child of the Prince and Princess of Wales (died 1767)
3 April - Hugh Davies, botanist (died 1821) 
date unknown - Richard Crawshay, industrialist (died 1810)

Deaths
5 May - Sir Roger Mostyn, 3rd Baronet, 65
6 June - John Griffith, MP for Caernarvonshire, about 52

References

1739 by country
1739 in Great Britain